Paenibacillus larvae is a species of bacterium, found worldwide, which causes American foulbrood, a fatal disease of the larvae of honeybees (Apis mellifera). It is a Gram-positive, rod-shaped bacterium, which forms spores which can remain viable for at least thirty-five years.

Morphology
P. larvae is a rod-shaped bacterium with slightly rounded ends, approximately 2.5–5 μm long and 0.5 μm wide. The spore of P. larvae is oval, approximately 0.6 μm wide and 1.3 μm long.

Classification
In 1906, G.F. White first described the bacterium that caused American foulbrood, and named it Bacillus larvae. In 1950, a bacterium isolated from bee larvae and associated with the rare disease "powdery scale" was named Bacillus pulvifaciens by Katznelson. In 1993, both B. larvae and B. pulvifaciens  were transferred to a new genus, Paenibacillus. The two species were combined into a single species: Paenibacillus larvae in 1996, remaining differentiated as two subspecies: P. larvae ssp. larvae (formerly Bacillus larvae) and P. larvae ssp. pulvifaciens (formerly Bacillus pulvifaciens). In 2006, the subspecies were eliminated based on spore morphology, biochemical profile and DNA testing, and when it was also demonstrated that experimental infection of honeybee larvae with the pulvifaciens subspecies caused American foulbrood signs without causing "powdery scale".

There are at least four genotypes of P. larvae, named after their enterobacterial repetitive intergenic consensus (ERIC) sequences. Genotype ERIC I corresponds to the former species of Bacillus larvae, and genotypes ERIC II, III and IV correspond to the former species of B. pulvifaciens. A fifth genotype ERIC V has recently been discovered in honey.

Epidemiology
P. larvae is found worldwide. Genotypes ERIC I and II are most frequently isolated from global AFB outbreaks. In contrast, genotypes ERIC III and IV are found in bacteriology archives and are considered practically unimportant. ERIC V was found in honey and has not been isolated from infected colonies yet.

American foulbrood

P. larvae causes American foulbrood in honeybees.

References

Paenibacillaceae
Bee diseases